Ross Lake or Lake Ross may refer to:

Australia 

 Lake Ross (Queensland), a reservoir in City of Townsville, Queensland

Canada 

 Ross Lake Provincial Park, in British Columbia

Ireland 

Ross Lake (Ireland), a lake in County Galway

New Zealand 

Lake Ross (New Zealand)

United States 

Ross Lake (Maine)
Ross Lake (Crow Wing County, Minnesota)
Ross Lake Township, Crow Wing County, Minnesota
Ross Lake (Ohio), a reservoir in Ross County
Ross Lake (Washington), a reservoir in Washington state and British Columbia
Ross Lake (Wood County, Wisconsin)